New Hope is a city in Marion County, Tennessee, United States. The population was 1,082 at the 2010 census, up from 1,043 in 2000. It is part of the Chattanooga, TN–GA Metropolitan Statistical Area.

History
Originally known as Antioch, New Hope incorporated in 1974 to avoid an annexation attempt by South Pittsburg, which most of the new city's residents opposed.  The name "New Hope" was taken from a local church and cemetery. It is located on the eastern shore of the Tennessee River at the Alabama/Tennessee state line. Early settlers and travelers reached New Hope from the western shore by the South Pittsburg Ferry (called "Sharon") on the river until the construction of the Shelby Rhinehart Bridge (Blue Bridge) in 1981.

Geography
New Hope is located at  (35.000112, -85.653332). The city occupies the south side of a U-shaped bend of the Tennessee River, mostly downstream from Nickajack Dam. The city's municipal boundary stretches southward to the Tennessee-Alabama state line.  South Pittsburg lies across the river to the west, Kimball and Jasper lie across the river to the north, and Nickajack Lake lies to the east.  State Route 156 spans New Hope from east-to-west, connecting the city with U.S. Route 72 in South Pittsburg and Interstate 24 near Haletown.

Demographics

As of the 2020 United States census, there were 987 people, 361 households, and 231 families residing in the city.

2020 Census 
As of the census of 2020, there were 987 people, 347 households, and 303 families residing in the city. The population density was 101.1 people per square mile (39.0/km²). There were 444 housing units at an average density of 42.0 per square mile (16.2/km²). The racial makeup of the city was 98.75% White, 0.58% African American, 0.10% Native American, 0.10% Asian, 0.10% from other races, and 0.38% from two or more races.

There were 400 households out of which 36.3% had children under the age of 18 living with them, 63.8% were married couples living together, 8.8% had a female householder with no husband present, and 24.3% were non-families. 21.8% of all households were made up of individuals and 8.3% had someone living alone who was 65 years of age or older. The average household size was 2.61 and the average family size was 3.02.

In the city, the population was spread out with 26.7% under the age of 18, 6.4% from 18 to 24, 31.4% from 25 to 44, 26.6% from 45 to 64, and 8.9% who were 65 years of age or older. The median age was 36 years. For every 100 females, there were 95.0 males. For every 100 females age 18 and over, there were 88.9 males.

The median income for a household in the city was $35,179, and the median income for a family was $38,500. Males had a median income of $31,771 versus $23,438 for females. The per capita income for the city was $15,424. About 13.0% of families and 14.8% of the population were below the poverty line, including 15.9% of those under age 18 and 8.5% of those age 65 or over.

Government 
New Hope is governed by an elected body of aldermen and a mayor.  The City Hall of New Hope is located at 2610 Highway 156. Across the highway is located the headquarters for the New Hope Fire Department, a trained group of volunteers in the community. The New Hope City Park was formerly behind the Fire Station.

Culture 
Author William Least Heat-Moon mentions New Hope, Tennessee in Blue Highways: A Journey into America, published in 1982 by Little, Brown and Company, chronicling the author's 12000-mile trip in remote places around the United States. Festival Opera presented Carlisle Floyd’s “Susannah,” July 12 and July 14, 2019 at the Lesher Center for the Arts in Walnut Creek, CA. Dubbed as “an American tale of innocence, lust, and social consequence,” the opera centers on the main character, 18-year-old Susannah Polk, a typical teenager entering womanhood in the quiet mountain town of New Hope, Tennessee, when she finds herself bereft of hope as she becomes the target of ruthless and malicious gossip.

Points of interest 
Nickajack Dam is located on the eastern edge of New Hope near Hwy 156 on the Tennessee River. It is a hydroelectric facility with four generating units with a summer net dependable capacity of 107 megawatts.

New Hope is home to the Maple View Public Use Area, located adjacent to Nickajack Cave Wildlife Refuge and home to federally endangered bats. In one evening in June 2019, representatives from Tennessee Valley Authority and Tennessee Wildlife Resources Agency counted 97,026 bats leaving to feed and returning to the cave.

New Hope is also home to the Shrine of Our Lady Virgin of the Poor, built by Benedictine monks in 1982 for spiritual contemplation and open to anyone of any faith. The Shrine is located on a 600 acre farm in New Hope and opens from sunrise to sunset every day. It is a replica of the shrine in Banneaux, Belgium and includes a lovely chapel, statuary, stations of the Cross, a small outdoor meeting area, a covered picnic area and restrooms. New Hope is home to two protestant churches, Antioch Missionary Baptist Church and Pine Grove Baptist Church.

Businesses 
New Hope is home to several large manufacturing and distribution facilities, including Colonial Chemical, Inc. and Lodge Manufacturing Co. Colonial Chemical, Inc. hosts a quarterly litter pick-up along a two-mile stretch of Highway 156. A $500,000 Appalachian Regional Commission grant will assist with the construction of a rail spur to provide rail service into Nickajack Port Industrial Park in New Hope and enable Colonial Chemical Inc. to move forward with its planned expansion. Groundbreaking for this project was held at Colonial Chemical on April 15, 2022.  Also located in New Hope is a manufacturing site for Tree Brand Packaging, Inc. producing high-quality pallets and skids and H & P Meats, an Animal Welfare approved meat processing and wholesale plant. Fox Trading Post is a bait shop near the dam in HogJaw Valley. Tim and Nancy's Barber and Style opened in 2013 and is located near the center of town in a renovated church building. In 2018, New Hope welcomed a Dollar General Store.

References

External links

Municipal Technical Advisory Service entry for New Hope — information on local government, elections, and link to charter

Cities in Tennessee
Cities in Marion County, Tennessee
Chattanooga metropolitan area
Populated places on the Tennessee River